Bucculatrix gossypiella is a moth in the family Bucculatricidae. It is found in North America, where it has been recorded from Mexico. The species was described in 1927 by A. W. Morrill.

References

Natural History Museum Lepidoptera generic names catalog

Bucculatricidae
Moths described in 1927
Moths of North America